Ruth Souza may refer to:
 Ruth Roberta de Souza, Brazilian basketball player
 Ruth de Souza Brazilian actress